"Good Guys Only Win in Movies" is the last single by pop singer C. C. Catch from her third studio album Like a Hurricane. It was released in 1989 as a single by Hansa.

The song features dialogue lines sampled from various episodes of Star Trek: The Original Series:
 "...Computerized half-breed", "My mother was a teacher", "I was happy": This Side of Paradise
 "Including the captain" : Turnabout Intruder
 "Ahead warp factor one, Mister Sulu" : Shore Leave
 "I read no evidence of malfunction" : The Way to Eden

Track listing
Original versions
"Good Guys Only Win in Movies (Album Version)" – 5:42
"Good Guys Only Win in Movies (Radio Version)" – 3:48

References

1987 singles
C. C. Catch songs
Songs written by Dieter Bohlen
Song recordings produced by Dieter Bohlen
1987 songs
Hansa Records singles